The Secret Lives of Men is an American sitcom that aired on ABC from September 30, 1998 to November 11, 1998. The series aired in full in Ireland on RTÉ2.

Premise
Three divorced men get thrown back into the bachelor life. With nothing left but each other, Michael, Phil, and Andy form an exclusive club and embark on a new phase of their existence. Someday, they might comprehend the mysteries of women, love and golf. Until then, they'll continue carrying on The Secret Lives of Men.

Cast
Peter Gallagher as Michael
Bradley Whitford as Phil
Mitch Rouse as Andy
Sofia Milos as Maria

Episodes

References

External links

Pazsaz Entertainment Network

1998 American television series debuts
1998 American television series endings
1990s American sitcoms
English-language television shows
American Broadcasting Company original programming
Television shows set in New York City
Television series by Warner Bros. Television Studios